Riverdale may refer to:

Buildings
Riverdale Centre, former name for Lewisham Shopping Centre, London, England
Riverdale House, a Victorian mansion in Sheffield, England
Riverdale (Selma, Alabama), a historic plantation house in Dallas County, Alabama, United States
Riverdale Village, a mall in Coon Rapids, Minnesota, United States
Riverdale, the estate of John Lothrop Motley and later Albert W. Nickerson
 Riverdale (Odessa, Delaware), listed on the National Register of Historic Places in New Castle County, Delaware, United States

Entertainment
Riverdale (Archie Comics), the fictional town in which the Archie Comics are set
Riverdale (2017 TV series), an American television series based on the Archie comic book series
Riverdale (1997 TV series), a Canadian soap opera

Places

Canada
Riverdale, Edmonton, Alberta
Riverdale Municipality, Manitoba
Riverdale, Nova Scotia
Riverdale, Toronto, Ontario
Riverdale station (Toronto)
Riverdale (provincial electoral district)
Riverdale Ward, a former municipal ward of the city of Ottawa, Ontario
Riverdale, Whitehorse, Yukon

United States
Riverdale (Little Rock), Arkansas
Riverdale, California
Riverdale, Mendocino County, California
Riverdale, Georgia, a suburb of Atlanta
Riverdale, Chicago, Illinois
Riverdale station (Illinois) 
Riverdale, Illinois
Riverdale, Iowa
Riverdale, Kansas
Riverdale Park, Maryland, a town originally named Riverdale
Riverdale station (MARC), a train station
Riverdale, a neighborhood of Gloucester, Massachusetts
Riverdale, a neighborhood of Dedham, Massachusetts
Riverdale, Michigan
 Riverdale, Mississippi
 Riverdale, Missouri
Riverdale, Nebraska
Riverdale, New Jersey
Riverdale, Bronx, New York
Riverdale station (Metro-North)
Riverdale, North Dakota
Riverdale, Dayton, Ohio
Riverdale, Halifax County, Virginia
Riverdale, Roanoke, Virginia
Riverdale, Utah
Riverdale Township (disambiguation)

New Zealand
 Riverdale, New Zealand, a suburb of Gisborne
 Riverdale, the original name of Bainham in the Tasman District

Schools
Riverdale High School (disambiguation)
Riverdale Country School, a private school in the Bronx, New York, United States
Riverdale Academy (Louisiana), a private school in Red River Parish, United States
Riverdale Baptist School, a Christian school in Upper Marlboro, Maryland, United States
Riverdale Collegiate Institute, a high school in Toronto, Ontario, Canada
Riverdale School, Palmerston North, a primary (elementary) school in New Zealand

Other uses
Baron Riverdale, a title in the Peerage of the United Kingdom

See also 
Riversdale (disambiguation)